Palermo is a 1937 Argentine comedy film directed by Arturo S. Mom and starring Nedda Francy, José Gola and Orestes Caviglia. The film's title refers to the Palermo neighborhood of Buenos Aires. The story was written by Guillermo Salazar Altamira, a sports journalist.

Synopsis
A petty criminal attempts to fleece a wealthy horse racing fan with the help of a beautiful woman who turns out to be an undercover member of the police.

Cast
 Nedda Francy 
 José Gola 
 Orestes Caviglia 
 Pedro Quartucci 
 Aída Luz 
 Pablo Palitos 
 Sebastián Chiola 
 Juan Mangiante 
 Pedro Fiorito 
 Fausto Fornoni 
 Miguel Mileo 
 Augusto Codecá
 Darío Cossier

References

Bibliography
 Abel Posadas, Mónica Landro, Marta Speroni. Cine sonoro argentino: 1933-1943. El Calafate Editores, 2005.

External links

1937 films
Argentine sports comedy films
1930s sports comedy films
1930s Spanish-language films
Argentine black-and-white films
Films directed by Arturo S. Mom
Films set in Buenos Aires
1937 comedy films
1930s Argentine films